Roy Abelardo Nikisch (born 1951) is an Argentine Radical Civic Union senator, who served as governor of Chaco Province between 2003 and 2007.

Nikisch was mayor of Tres Isletas and later served as vice governor of Chaco under Ángel Rozas until 2003.

In 2003, Nikisch was elected governor of the province with 53% of the vote, leading the Alianza Frente de Todos to victory over Jorge Capitanich of the Justicialist Party.  His term expired in 2007, when he was elected to the Argentine Senate.

External links 
 Chaco Province (Spanish)

1951 births
Living people
Governors of Chaco Province
Vice Governors of Chaco Province
People from Tres Isletas
Argentine people of Croatian descent
Mayors of places in Argentina
Members of the Argentine Senate for Chaco
Radical Civic Union politicians